Allen Crowe (November 12, 1928 – June 2, 1963) is an American race car driver.

Born in Springfield, Illinois, Crowe died in New Bremen, Ohio, from injuries sustained in a sprint car race at New Bremen Speedway.  He drove in the USAC Championship Car series, racing in the 1961–1963 seasons with 15 starts, including the 1962 and 1963 Indianapolis 500 races.  He finished in the top ten six times, with his best finish in 5th position in 1962 at Syracuse.

The ARCA Menards Series  race at the Illinois State Fairgrounds Racetrack is named in his memory.

References

1928 births
1963 deaths
Indianapolis 500 drivers
People from Springfield, Illinois
Racing drivers from Illinois
Racing drivers who died while racing
Sports deaths in Ohio